Bacău County is a county (județ) of Romania, in Western Moldavia, with its capital city at Bacău. It has one commune, Ghimeș-Făget, in Transylvania.

Geography

In the western part of the county there are mountains from the Eastern Carpathian group. Here, along the valleys of the Oituz River and Trotuș River, there are two important links between Moldavia and Transylvania. On the East side, the heights decrease and the lowest point can be found on the Siret River valley which crosses the county from North to South down the middle. On the East side there is the Moldavian Plateau crossed by many small rivers.

Flora and fauna
Bears, wolves, foxes, wild boars, and squirrels inhabit Bacău County's mountains, particularly in its rural Slănic-Moldova region; the remnants of the local deers are preserved in Mănăstirea Cașin.

Neighbours

Vaslui County in the East.
Harghita County and Covasna County in the West.
Neamț County in the North.
Vrancea County in the South.

Economy
The county of Bacău was one of the most industrialized regions in the communist period and it remained Moldavia's most important industrial center ever since. There are two large oil refineries at Onești and Dărmănești. Following the collapse of the communist regime, Bacău continued to be the region's most important GDP supplier, but the county became more famous for the controversial figures involved in local economy than for its performance.

The predominant industries in the county are:
 The chemical and oil industry.
 Food industry.
 Construction materials industry.
 Wood and paper industry.
 Textile industry.
 Mechanical components industry.
 Aeronautics industry.

In Bacău county there are important reserves of oil and salt. Also coal is exploited.

Tourism
The main tourist destinations in the county are:
 The cities of Bacău and Onești.
 The resorts:
 Poiana Sărată
 Poiana Uzului
 Slănic-Moldova
 Târgu Ocna
 The .

Demographics 

Some estimates put the total number of Csángós at around 70,000 in 1987.

Politics 

The Bacău County Council, renewed at the 2020 local elections, consists of 36 councillors, with the following party composition:

People
 Gabriela Adameșteanu
 Vasile Alecsandri
 George Bacovia
 Radu Beligan
 Nadia Comăneci
 Loredana Groza
 Vasile Pârvan
 Lucrețiu Pătrășcanu
 Radu R. Rosetti
 Tristan Tzara

Administrative divisions

Bacău County has 3 municipalities, 5 towns and 85 communes
Municipalities
Bacău – capital city; population: 144,307 (as of 2011)
Moinești
Onești
Towns
Buhuși
Comănești
Dărmănești
Slănic-Moldova
Târgu Ocna

Communes
Agăș
Ardeoani
Asău
Balcani
Berești-Bistrița
Berești-Tazlău
Berzunţi
Bârsănești
Blăgești
Bogdănești
Brusturoasa
Buciumi
Buhoci
Cașin
Căiuți
Cleja
Colonești
Corbasca
Coțofănești
Dămienești
Dealu Morii
Dofteana
Faraoani
Filipeni
Filipești
Găiceana
Ghimeș-Făget
Gârleni
Glăvănești
Gioseni
Gura Văii
Helegiu
Hemeiuș
Huruiești
Horgești
Izvoru Berheciului
Itești
Letea Veche
Lipova
Livezi
Luizi-Călugăra
Măgirești
Măgura
Mănăstirea Cașin
Mărgineni
Motoșeni
Negri
Nicolae Bălcescu
Odobești
Oituz
Oncești
Orbeni
Palanca
Parava
Pâncești
Parincea
Pârgărești
Pârjol
Plopana
Podu Turcului
Poduri
Prăjești
Racova
Răcăciuni
Răchitoasa
Roșiori
Sascut
Sănduleni
Sărata
Săucești
Scorțeni
Secuieni
Solonț
Stănișești
Strugari
Ștefan cel Mare
Tamași
Tătărăști
Târgu Trotuș
Traian
Ungureni
Urechești
Valea Seacă
Vultureni
Zemeș

Politics
Bacău became famous after electing Ilie Ilașcu of the Greater Romania Party as their Senator, while he was held in prison in Transnistria.

Historical county

Between the world wars, Bacău County had a different territorial extent. The county was located in the east central part of Greater Romania, in the center of Moldavia. Its territory included the central part of the current Bacău County. It bordered on the west with the counties of Trei Scaune and Ciuc, in the north with Neamț and Roman, in the east with the counties of Tutova and Tecuci, and in the south with the county of Putna.

Administration
The county was originally divided into five districts (plăși):
Plasa Bistrița
Plasa Muntele, headquartered in Muntele
Plasa Oituz, headquartered in Oituz
Plasa Siret, headquartered in Siret
Plasa Tazlău, headquartered in Tazlău

Subsequently, two more districts were established:
Plasa Răcăciuni, headquartered in Răcăciuni
Plasa Traian, headquartered in Traian

Population
According to the 1930 census data, the county population was 260,781, comprising 88.6% Romanians, 5.3% Jews, 3.3% Hungarians, as well as other minorities. From the religious point of view, 75.8% were Eastern Orthodox, 18.1% Roman Catholics, 5.5% Jewish, as well as other minorities.

Urban population
In 1930, the county's urban population was 50,342, of which 70.1% were Romanians, 23.9% were Jews, 2.2% were Hungarians, as well as other minorities. From a religious point of view, the urban population consisted of 64.9% Eastern Orthodox, 24.4% Jewish, 9.3% Roman Catholic, as well as other minorities.

References

 
Counties of Romania
1879 establishments in Romania
1938 disestablishments in Romania
States and territories disestablished in 1938
States and territories established in 1879
1940 establishments in Romania
1950 disestablishments in Romania
States and territories established in 1940
States and territories disestablished in 1950
1968 establishments in Romania
States and territories established in 1968